Chrysomphalina is a genus of three species of fungi with a north temperate distribution. The genus was circumscribed by Swiss mycologist Heinz Clémençon in 1982.

See also
List of Agaricales genera

References

Agaricales genera
Hygrophoraceae